Altoona Metro Transit (AMTRAN) is a public transportation service located in Altoona, Pennsylvania. It provides bus and paratransit service to Altoona, Hollidaysburg, and select communities in the region. Amtran offers a tripper for school students as well as shuttle services for Penn State Altoona.

Current routes 
(Two buses run the #1 Crosstown – One bus runs to Walmart every 40 minutes after the hour. The other bus runs the 25th Ave on the hour.)
1. #1 Crosstown Walmart – Transit center to Walmart. Services Devorris Center, Broad Ave, Amtran office, 58th Street, Logan Valley Mall, Walmart, Goes back to Transit center turning into #1 Crosstown 25th Ave. (The Last #1 Crosstown to Walmart is 4:40 PM)
1 Crosstown 25th Ave – Services Devorris Center, 22nd Ave and 4th Street, Penn State Altoona, 13th Street and 20th Ave to Transit center.
(The last #1 Crosstown 25th Ave is 5:00 PM)

2. #2 East End – Leaves the Transit on the hour.  -  Services 17th Street, 1st Ave to 15th Street & up 2nd Ave, Kettle Street, Weis Markets on Pleasant Valley blvd & Valley View, back to the Transit center via 7th Street.
(The last #2 East End to Weis Markets in Pleasant Valley Blvd & Valley View is 5:00 PM)

There is two buses that run the #3 Flash, (#3 Flash Ivyside & #3 Flash LTC)
3. #3 Flash to Ivyside leaves the Transit center 20 minutes after the hour. - Services Devorris Center, UPMC Altoona Hospital, Martin's on Chestnut Ave, Cherry Grove apartments, Penn State Altoona then back to the Transit Center. (Last #3 Flash Ivyside to Penn State Altoona is 5:20 PM)
3 Flash LTC (Logan Town Center) Leaves the Transit center on the hour. - Services 17th Street, Station Medical Center, Aldi Foods, Logan Town Center (Giant Eagle) back to the Transit Center stopping back into Station Medical Center.
(Last #3 Flash LTC  to Giant Eagle is 5:00 PM.)

4. #4 Plank Road leaves the Transit Center on the hour. - Services 17th Street via 7th Ave, Amtran office, Logan Blvd, Martin's on the Blvd, Logan Valley Mall, Park Hills Plaza, back into the Transit Center.
(Last #4 Plank Road to Logan Valley Mall is 5:00 PM)

There is two #5 Pleasant Valley buses one is the #5 Pleasant Valley Ivyside the other is #5 Pleasant Valley Walmart)
5. #5 Pleasant Valley Ivyside leaves the Transit Center 40 minutes after the hour. -Services Devorris Center, UPMC Altoona Hospital, Martin's on Chestnut Ave, Cherry Grove apartments, Penn State Altoona, back into the Transit Center.
Last #5 Pleasant Valley Ivyside leaves at 4:40 PM)
5 Pleasant Valley Walmart leaves 20 minutes after the hour. - Services 17th Street via 7th Ave, up 22nd ave, down Pleasant Valley Blvd to VA Hospital, down the Pleasant Valley Blvd to Logan Valley Mall, Walmart & Target back to the Transit Center via 22nd Ave & 6th Ave. (The last #5 Pleasant Valley Walmart is 5:20 PM)

6. #6 Greenwood leaves 30 minutes after the hour. - Services 17th Street, Station Medical Center, 17th Street via 6th Ave, Lloyd street, Kettle Street, Weis Markets on Pleasant Valley Blvd and Valley View, back on Pleasant Valley Blvd to Martin's in Greenwood, back to the Transit Center.
(Last #6 Greenwood is 4:30 PM)

7. #7 Juniata leaves 30 minutes after the hour. - Services Devorris Center, Chestnut Ave, North 4th Ave and 18th Street, North 8th Ave and 4th Street, Martin's Chestnut Ave, UPMC Altoona Hospital, back to Transit Center.
(Last #7 Juniata is 5:30 PM)

(#8 Hollidaysburg is only a direct bus to and from Hollidaysburg to the Altoona Walmart & Logan Valley Mall)
8. #8 Hollidaysburg leaves Logan Valley Mall 30 minutes on the hour. - Services Logan Valley Mall, Logan Blvd towards Lakemont, UPMC Logan Medical Center, to the Dream restaurant in Hollidaysburg, Spring Manor, Hometown market, Blair County Court House, Martin's in Duncansville, Graystone, Hollidaysburg Veterans Home, Walmart, Logan Valley Mall. (The Last #8 Hollidaysburg bus leaves the Logan Valley Mall at 4:30 PM)

9. #9 Lakemont leaves the Transit Center on the hour. - Services 17th Street to Pleasant Valley Blvd, Pleasant Valley shopping center (Save a lot, Dollar Tree), Blair County Ball Park, Lakemont, Convention Center Blvd, Walmart, Logan Valley Mall, AMC movie theater on Convention Center Blvd, back to the Transit Center. (Last #9 Lakemont is 5:00 PM)

11. #11 Early Bird leaves the Amtran office at 5:52 AM and starts at the Transit Center at 6:00 AM. - Services Broad Ave, Logan Blvd, Plank Road, Logan Valley Mall, Walmart, North Communications, Quality Control Inspections (QCI), 58th street & California Ave, 6th Ave to Logan Blvd and Beale Ave, Union Ave, 12th Ave, Devorris Center,  Chestnut Ave, North 4th Ave Juniata North 18th Street, return to North 4th Ave, North 4th Street, North 8th Ave & Broadway, 25th Ave, Juniata Gap Road, Chestnut Ave, back to the Transit Center via the Expressway. Leaves the Transit at 7:05 AM via Broad Ave, 24th Street, Union Ave, Frankstown road, Fairway Drive, VA Hospital, down Pleasant Valley Blvd to 7th Street back to the Transit Center. (#11 Early Bird is done at 7:25 AM)

12. #12 Night Owl starts at 6:00 PM and ends at 10:00 PM. - Services 17th Street, Logan Town Center & Giant Eagle, Pleasant Valley shopping (Save a lot, Dollar Tree), Walmart, Logan Valley Mall, 58th street, down 6th Ave, up 17th Street to 1st Ave & 2nd to Lloyd street, down 7th Ave, over 7th Street bridge expressway, 9th Street, Down Green Ave and 12th Street to the Transit Center.
(The #12 Night Owl starts at 6:00 PM and ends at 10:00 PM. The last Night Owl to Walmart leaves the Transit Center at 9:00 PM)

14. #14 Evening Flash starts at 6:00 PM and ends at 10:00 PM. - Services Devorris Center, UPMC Altoona Hospital, Martin's Chestnut Ave, Cherry Grove apartments, Penn State Altoona, The Pointe, back to Penn State Altoona, Broadway, Cherry Grove apartments, Martin's Chestnut Ave, UPMC Altoona Hospital, Green Ave and 12th Street to Transit center. (The last #14 Evening Flash to Penn State Altoona is 10:00 PM)

15. #15 the Pointe starts at 7:15 AM – Services only Penn State Altoona. After 6:00 PM the Pointe is provided by the #14 Evening Flash.

References 

Bus transportation in Pennsylvania
Paratransit services in the United States
Altoona, Pennsylvania
Transportation in Blair County, Pennsylvania
Government of Blair County, Pennsylvania